The following is a timeline of virtualization development. In computing, virtualization is the use of a computer to simulate another computer. Through virtualization, a host simulates a guest by exposing virtual hardware devices, which may be done through software or by allowing access to a physical device connected to the machine.

Timeline 

Note: This timeline is missing data for important historical systems, including: Atlas Computer (Manchester), GE 645, Burroughs B5000.

Year 1960 

In the mid-1960s, IBM's Cambridge Scientific Center developed CP-40, the first version of CP/CMS. It went into production use in January 1967. From its inception, CP-40 was intended to implement full virtualization. Doing so required hardware and microcode customization on a S/360-40, to provide the necessary address translation and other virtualization features. Experience on the CP-40 project provided input to the development of the IBM System/360 Model 67, announced in 1965 (along with its ill-starred operating system, TSS/360). CP-40 was re-implemented for the S/360-67 as CP-67, and by April 1967, both versions were in daily production use. CP/CMS was made generally available to IBM customers in source code form, as part of the unsupported IBM Type-III Library, in 1968.

Year 1964 

 IBM Cambridge Scientific Center begins development of CP-40.

Year 1965 

IBM M44/44X, experimental paging system, in use at Thomas J. Watson Research Center.
 IBM announces the IBM System/360-67, a 32-bit CPU with virtual memory hardware (August 1965).

Year 1966 

IBM ships the S/360-67 computer in June 1966.
 IBM begins work on CP-67, a re-implementation of CP-40 for the S/360-67.

Year 1967 

 CP-40 (January) and CP-67 (April) go into production time-sharing use.

Year 1968 

CP/CMS installed at eight initial customer sites.
 CP/CMS submitted to IBM Type-III Library by MIT's Lincoln Laboratory, making system available to all IBM S/360 customers at no charge in source code form.
 Resale of CP/CMS access begins at time-sharing vendor National CSS (becoming a distinct version, eventually renamed VP/CSS).

Year 1971 

 First System/370 shipped: S/370-155 (January).

Year 1970 

IBM announced the System/370 in 1970. To the disappointment of CP/CMS users – as with the System/360 announcement – the series would not include virtual memory. In 1972, IBM changed direction, announcing that the option would be made available on all S/370 models, and also announcing several virtual storage operating systems, including VM/370. By the mid-1970s, CP/CMS, VM, and the maverick VP/CSS were running on a numerous large IBM mainframes. By the late 80s, there were reported to be more VM licenses than MVS licenses.

Year 1972 

Announcement of virtual memory added to System/370 series.
 VM/370 announced – and running on announcement date. VM/370 includes the ability to run VM under VM (previously implemented both at IBM and at user sites under CP/CMS, but not made part of standard releases)

Year 1973 

 First shipment of announced virtual memory S/370 models (April: -158, May: -168).

Year 1977 

 Initial commercial release of VAX/VMS, later renamed OpenVMS.

Year 1979 

 The chroot system call was introduced during development of Version 7 Unix. Laying a foundation for container virtualization.

Year 1985 

 October 9, 1985: Announcement of the Intel 80286-based AT&T 6300+ with Simultask, a virtual machine monitor developed by Locus Computing Corporation in collaboration with AT&T, that enabled the direct execution of an Intel 8086 guest operating system under a host Unix System V Release 2 OS. Although the product was marketed with Microsoft MS-DOS as the guest OS, in fact the Virtual Machine could support any realmode operating system or standalone program (such as Microsoft Flight Simulator) that was written using only valid 8086 instructions (not instructions introduced with the 80286). Locus subsequently developed this technology into their "Merge" product line.

Year 1987 

January 1987:  A "product evaluation" version of Merge/386 from Locus Computing Corporation was made available to OEMs. Merge/386 made use of the Virtual 8086 mode provided by the Intel 80386 processor, and supported multiple simultaneous virtual 8086 machines. The virtual machines supported unmodified guest operating systems and standalone programs such as Microsoft Flight Simulator; but in typical usage the guest was MS-DOS with a Locus proprietary redirector (also marketed for networked PCs as "PC-Interface") and a "network" driver that provided communication with a regular user-mode file server process running under the host operating system on the same machine.
 October 1987:  Retail Version 1.0 of Merge/386 began shipping, offered with Microport Unix System V Release 3.

Year 1988 

SoftPC 1.0 for Sun was introduced in 1988 by Insignia Solutions. 
 SoftPC appears in its first version for Apple Macintosh. These versions (Sun and Macintosh) only have support for DOS.

Year 1991 

 IBM introduced OS/2 Virtual DOS machine (VDM) with support for x86 virtual 8086 mode, being capable of virtualize DOS/Windows and other 16 bits operating systems, like CP/M-86

Year 1994 

 Kevin Lawton leaves MIT Lincoln Lab and start the Bochs project. Bochs was initially coded for x86 architecture, capable of emulating BIOS, processor and other x86-compatible hardware, by simple algorithms, isolated from the rest of the environment, eventually incorporating the ability to run different processor algorithms under x86-architecture or the host, including bios and core processor (Itanium x64, x86_64, ARM, MIPS, PowerPC, etc.), and with the advantage that the application is multi platform (BSD, Linux, Windows, Mac, Solaris).

Year 1997 

 First version of Virtual PC for Macintosh platform was released in June 1997 by Connectix

Year 1998 

June 15, 1998, Simics/sun4m is presented at USENIX'98, demonstrating full system simulation booting Linux 2.0.30 and Solaris 2.6 unmodified from dd'ed disks. .
 October 26, 1998, VMware filed for a patent on their techniques, which was granted as U.S. Patent 6,397,242

Year 1999 

On February 8, 1999, VMware introduced the first x86 virtualization product for the Intel IA-32 architecture, known as VMware Virtual Platform, based on earlier research by its founders at Stanford University.

VMware Virtual Platform was based on software emulation with Guest/Host OS design that required all Guest environments be stored as files under the host OS filesystem.

Year 2000 

FreeBSD 4.0 is released, including initial implementation of FreeBSD jails.
 IBM announces z/VM, new version of VM for IBM's 64-bit z/Architecture.

Year 2001 

January 31, 2001, AMD and Virtutech release Simics/x86-64 ("Virtuhammer") to support the new 64-bit architecture for x86.  Virtuhammer is used to port Linux distributions and the Windows kernel to x86-64 well before the first x86-64 processor (Opteron) was available in April 2003.
 June, Connectix launches its first version of Virtual PC for Windows.
 July, VMware created the first x86 server virtualization product.
 Egenera, Inc. launches their Processor Area Network (PAN Manager) software and BladeFrame chassis which provide hardware virtualization of processing blade's (pBlade) internal disk, network interface cards, and serial console.
 Virtuozzo (earlier named SWsoft) had developed was later being called Containers for Linux since 1999 and released a first version in 2001.

Year 2003 

First release of first open-source x86 hypervisor, Xen. 
 February 18, 2003, Microsoft acquired virtualization technologies (Virtual PC and unreleased product called "Virtual Server") from Connectix Corporation. 
 Late 2003, EMC acquired VMware for $635 million.
 Late 2003, VERITAS acquired Ejascent for $59 million.
 November 10, 2003 Microsoft releases Microsoft Virtual PC, which is machine-level virtualization technology, to ease the transition to Windows XP.

Year 2005 

HP releases Integrity Virtual Machines 1.0 and 1.2 which ran only HP-UX.
 October 24, 2005 VMware releases VMware Player, a free player for virtual machines, to the masses.
 Sun releases Solaris 10, including Solaris Zones, for both x86/x64 and SPARC systems.

Year 2006 

July 12, 2006 VMware releases VMware Server, a free machine-level virtualization product for the server market.
 Microsoft Virtual PC 2006 is released as a free program, also in July.
 July 17, 2006 Microsoft bought Softricity.
 August 16, 2006 VMware announces of the winners of the virtualization appliance contest.
 September 26, 2006 moka5 delivers LivePC technology.
 HP releases Integrity Virtual Machines Version 2.0, which supports Windows Server 2003, CD and DVD burners, tape drives and VLAN.
 December 11, 2006 Virtual Iron releases Virtual Iron 3.1, a free bare metal virtualization product for enterprise server virtualization market.

Year 2007 

Open source KVM released which is integrated with Linux kernel and provides virtualization on only Linux system, it needs hardware support.
 January 15, 2007 innoTek released VirtualBox Open Source Edition (OSE), the first professional PC virtualization solution released as open source under the GNU General Public License (GPL). It includes some code from the QEMU project.
 Sun releases Solaris 8 Containers to enable migration of a Solaris 8 computer into a Solaris Container on a Solaris 10 system – for SPARC only.

Year 2008 

 The first Linux kernel mainline featuring cgroups (developed by Google since 2006) was released. And based upon the first version of Linux Containers (LXC)  was released. Laying a foundation for later technologies like Docker, Systemd-nspawn and Podman.
January 15, 2008 VMware, Inc. announced it has entered into a definitive agreement to acquire Thinstall, a privately held application virtualization software company.
 February 12, 2008 Sun Microsystems announced that it had entered into a stock purchase agreement to acquire innotek, makers of VirtualBox.
 In April, VMware releases VMware Workstation 6.5 beta, the first program for Windows and Linux to enable DirectX 9 accelerated graphics on Windows XP guests .

Year 2013 

Docker, Inc. releases Docker, a series of platform as a service (PaaS) products that use OS-level virtualization.

Year 2014 

Sep 8, 2014 Initially designed by Google, the first public build of Kubernetes was released. When Kubernetes first debuted, it offered a number of advantages over Docker, the most popular containerization platform at the time. The purpose of Kubernetes was to make it simple for users to deploy containerized applications across a sizable cluster of container hosts. In order to offer more features and functionality for managing containerized applications at scale, Kubernetes was created to complement Docker rather than to completely replace it.

Overview of Virtualization

As an overview, there are three levels of virtualization 
 At the hardware level, the VMs can run multiple guest OSes. This is best used for testing and training that require networking interoperability between more than one OSes, since not only can the guest OSes be different from the host OS, there can be as many guest OS as VMs, as long as there is enough CPU, RAM and storage space. IBM introduced this around 1990 under the name logical partitioning (LPAR), at first only in the mainframe field.
 At the operating system level, it can only virtualize one OS: the guest OS is the host OS. This is similar to having many terminal server sessions without locking down the desktop. Thus, this is the best of both worlds, having the speed of a TS session with the benefit of full access to the desktop as a virtual machine, where the user can still control the quotas for CPU, RAM and HDD. Similar to the hardware level, this is still considered a Server Virtualization where each guest OS has its own IP address, so it can be used for networking applications such as web hosting.
 At the application level, it is running on the Host OS directly, without any guest OS, which can be in a locked down desktop, including in a terminal server session. This is called Application Virtualization or Desktop Virtualization, which virtualizes the front-end, whereas Server Virtualization virtualizes the back-end. Now, Application Streaming refers to delivering applications directly onto the desktop and running them locally. Traditionally in terminal server computing, the applications are running on the server, not locally, and streaming the screenshots onto the desktop.

Application virtualization 
Application virtualization solutions such as VMware ThinApp, Softricity, and Trigence attempt to separate application specific files and settings from the host operating system, thus allowing them to run in more-or-less isolated sandboxes without installation and without the memory and disk overhead of full machine virtualization. Application virtualization is tightly tied to the host OS and thus does not translate to other operating systems or hardware. VMware ThinApp and Softricity are Intel Windows centric, while Trigence supports Linux and Solaris. Unlike machine virtualization, Application virtualization does not use code emulation or translation so CPU related benchmarks run with no changes, though filesystem benchmarks may experience some performance degradation. On Windows, VMware ThinApp and Softricity essentially work by intercepting filesystem and registry requests by an application and redirecting those requests to a preinstalled isolated sandbox, thus allowing the application to run without installation or changes to the local PC. Though VMware ThinApp and Softricity both began independent development around 1998, behind the scenes VMware ThinApp and Softricity are implemented using different techniques:
 VMware ThinApp works by packaging an application into a single "packaged" EXE which includes the runtime plus the application data files and registry. VMware ThinApp's runtime is loaded by Windows as a normal Windows application, from there the runtime replaces the Windows loader, filesystem, and registry for the target application and presents a merged image of the host PC as if the application had been previously installed. VMware ThinApp replaces all related API functions for the host application, for example the ReadFile API supplied to the application must pass through VMware ThinApp before it reaches the operating system. If the application is reading a virtual file, VMware ThinApp handles the request itself otherwise the request will be passed on to the operating system. Because VMware ThinApp is implemented in user-mode without device drivers and it does not have a client that is preinstalled, applications can run directly from USB Flash or network shares without previously needing elevated security privileges.
 Softricity (acquired by Microsoft) operates on a similar principle using device drivers to intercept file request in ring0 at a level closer to the operating system.  Softricity installs a client in Administrator mode which can then be accessed by restricted users on the machine.  An advantage of virtualizing at the kernel level is the Windows Loader (responsible for loading EXE and DLL files) does not need to be re-implemented and greater application compatibility can be achieved with less work (Softricity claims to support most major applications). A disadvantage for ring0 implementation is it requires elevated security privileges to be installed and crashes or security defects can occur system wide rather than being isolated to a specific application.
Because Application Virtualization runs all application code natively, it can only provide security guarantees as strong as the host OS is able to provide. Unlike full machine virtualization, Application virtualization solutions currently do not work with device drivers and other code that runs at ring0 such as virus scanners. These special applications must be installed normally on the host PC to function.

Managed runtimes 

Another technique sometimes referred to as virtualization, is portable byte code execution using a standard portable native runtime (aka Managed Runtimes). The two most popular solutions today include Java and .NET. These solutions both use a process called JIT (Just in time) compilation to translate code from a virtual portable Machine Language into the local processor's native code. This allows applications to be compiled for a single architecture and then run on many different machines. Beyond machine portable applications, an additional advantage to this technique includes strong security guarantees. Because all native application code is generated by the controlling environment, it can be checked for correctness (possible security exploits) prior to execution. Programs must be originally designed for the environment in question or manually rewritten and recompiled to work for these new environments. For example, one cannot automatically convert or run a Windows / Linux native app on .NET or Java.  Because portable runtimes try to present a common API for applications for a wide variety of hardware, applications are less able to take advantage of OS specific features.  Portable application environments also have higher memory and CPU overheads than optimized native applications, but these overheads are much smaller compared with full machine virtualization. Portable Byte Code environments such as Java have become very popular on the server where a wide variety of hardware exist and the set of OS-specific APIs required is standard across most Unix and Windows flavors. Another popular feature among managed runtimes is garbage collection, which automatically detects unused data in memory and reclaims the memory without the developer having to explicitly invoke "free" operations.

Neutral view of application virtualization 
Given the industry-bias of the past, to be more neutral, there are also two other ways to look at the Application Level:
 The first type is application packagers (VMware ThinApp, Softricity) whereas the other is application compilers (Java and .NET). Because it is a packager, it can be used to stream applications without modifying the source code, whereas the latter can only be used to compile the source code.
 Another way to look at it is from the Hypervisor point of view. The first one is "hypervisor" in user mode, whereas the other is "hypervisor" in runtime mode. The hypervisor was put in quotation, because both of them have similar behavior in that they intercept system calls in a different mode: user mode; and runtime mode. The user mode intercepts the system calls from the runtime mode before going to kernel mode. The real hypervisor only needs to intercept the system call using hypercall in kernel mode. Hopefully, once Windows has a Hypervisor, Virtual machine monitor, there may even be no need for JRE and CLR. Moreover, in the case of Linux, maybe the JRE can be modified to run on top of the Hypervisor as a loadable kernel module running in kernel mode, instead of the having slow legacy runtime in user mode. Now, if it were running on top of the Linux Hypervisor directly, then it should be called Java OS, not just another runtime mode JIT.
 Mendel Rosenblum called the runtime mode a High-level language virtual machine in August 2004. However, at that time, the first type, intercepting system calls in user mode, was irresponsible and unthinkable, so he didn't mention it in his article. Hence, Application Streaming was still mysterious in 2004. Now, when the JVM, no longer High-level language virtual machines, becomes Java OS running on Linux Hypervisor, then Java Applications will have a new level of playing field, just as Windows Applications already has with Softricity.
 In summary, the first one is virtualizing the Binary Code so that it can be installed once and run anywhere, whereas the other is virtualizing the source code using Byte code or Managed code so that it can be written once and run anywhere. Both of them are actually partial solutions to the twin portability problems of: application portability; and source code portability. Maybe it is time to combine the two problems into one complete solution at the hypervisor level in the kernel mode.

Further development 

Microsoft bought Softricity on July 17, 2006, and popularized Application Streaming, giving traditional Windows applications a level playing field with Web and Java applications with respect to the ease of distribution (i.e. no more setup required, just click and run). Soon every JRE and CLR can run virtually in user mode, without kernel mode drivers being installed, such that there can even be multiple versions of JRE and CLR running concurrently in RAM.

The integration of the Linux Hypervisor into the Linux Kernel and that of the Windows Hypervisor into the Windows Kernel may make rootkit techniques such as the filter driver obsolete.
This may take a while as the Linux Hypervisor is still waiting for the Xen Hypervisor and VMware Hypervisor to be fully compatible with each other as Oracle impatiently pounding at the door to let the Hypervisor come into the Linux Kernel so that it can full steam ahead with its Grid Computing life. Meanwhile, Microsoft have decided to be fully compatible with the Xen Hypervisor
. IBM, of course, doesn't just sit idle as it is working with VMware for the x86 servers, and possibly helping Xen to move from x86 into Power ISA using the open source rHype.
Now, to make the Hypervisor party into a full house, Intel VT-x and AMD-V are hoping to ease and speed up para-virtualization so that a guest OS can be run unmodified.

See also 
 Comparison of platform virtualization software
 Comparison of application virtualization software
 Emulator
 Hypervisor
 IBM SAN Volume Controller
 OS-level virtualization
 Physical-to-Virtual
 Virtual tape library
 X86 virtualization

References

External links 
 Application Virtualization: Streamlining Distribution August 31, 2006—By James Drews
 Windows Virtualization from Microsoft
 Virtualization Overview from VMware
 An introduction to Virtualization
 Weblog post on the how virtualization can be used to implement Mandatory Access Control.
 The Effect of Virtualization on OS Interference in PDF format.
 VM/360 history
  VM/360 history
 Attacks on virtual machine emulators

Virtualization
Virtualization